Colombia–Kosovo relations are foreign relations between the Republic of Colombia and the Republic of Kosovo.

History 
Colombia recognized Kosovo on 6 August 2008, and both countries have established diplomatic relations on 3 March 2019. After the establishment of diplomatic relations, Kosovo expressed its intention to open an embassy in Bogotá.

See also 
Foreign relations of Colombia
Foreign relations of Kosovo

Notes

References 

Colombia–Kosovo relations